Ərəb (also, Arab-Kyukel’) is a village and municipality in the Agdash Rayon of Azerbaijan.  It has a population of 1,395.

References 

Populated places in Agdash District